Calum John Haggett (born 30 October 1990) is an English first-class cricketer who played for Kent County Cricket Club. An all-rounder, he bowls right-arm medium pace, and bats left-handed. He made his debut for Somerset in the 2010–11 Caribbean Twenty20 and played three T20 matches but these were the only appearances he made for Somerset. Having previously represented England U19s in their 2009 tour to Bangladesh, Haggett signed for Kent ahead of the 2013 English domestic season.

He was released by Kent at the end of the 2020 season after seven seasons with the side.

Life and career
Haggett was born in Taunton, England on 30 October 1990, Haggett attended Millfield, a private school in Street, Somerset. Having grown up in the village Shapwick, he first represented Somerset at Under 11 level, playing alongside future England international Jos Buttler, but for part of his time with the Somerset Academy Haggett suffered a serious a back injury which prevented him from bowling, although he held his own as a batsman. Haggett made a full recovery from this injury and signed a full contract with Somerset in the summer of 2009. That autumn he was selected to tour Bangladesh with the England Under-19 cricket team where he played one youth test and four youth ODIs, he was then named in the squad for the 2010 ICC Under-19 Cricket World Cup in New Zealand but had to withdraw from the squad, after it was discovered that he had a potentially life-threatening heart problem which required major surgery and which sidelined him for most of the 2010 season. Having made a full recovery Haggett was included in Somerset's squad for the 2010–11 Caribbean Twenty20, and made his debut for the county against Guyana claiming a wicket. Haggett played two more matches in the tournament as Somerset went out in the group stages, after failing to break into the county's first eleven Haggett left the club at the end of the 2011 English cricket season.

In March 2013, Haggett signed for Kent ahead of the 2013 English cricket season. After a season where he averaged over 35 with the bat and took 26 wickets, he signed a new contract for the 2014 season.

After playing in all of Kent's limited-overs matches during the 2018 season, Hagget signed another contract extension after the end of the season, keeping him at Kent until 2020. He did not play at all for the county's first XI in 2019 due to injuries, but returned to the T20 side during the shortened 2020 season before being released at the end of the season. He played minor counties cricket for Devon County Cricket Club in 2021.

Career Best Performances
Updated 8 October 2020

References

External links
 

1990 births
Living people
Sportspeople from Taunton
People educated at Millfield
English cricketers
Somerset cricketers
Kent cricketers
Devon cricketers